Dorcas Wangira is a Kenyan journalist and reporter. With a report on the harm caused by female genital mutilation and the hope offered by five tech-savvy teenage girls, she won the 2019 International Centre for Journalists (IFCJ) Michael Eliott Award for Excellence in African Storytelling. Out of 218 applicants, her report titled The App and The Cut which was aired on KTN News in June 2018 was selected as the winning report .

Education 
Wangira attended Moi University where she studied Communication and Public Relations.

Career 
While in school, she had the opportunity to intern with the Standard Media Group in February 2014 after winning a joint competition sponsored by the Standard Group and UNDP. Prior to that she worked and the Communications Commission of Kenya. After working with KTN news of the Standard Group at Kakamega for more than two years, in June 2017 she left to be a freelance journalist. Later she worked with Citizen TV,  a renowned television station in Kenya, owned by Royal Media Services. She spent two weeks at  The Economist in the United Kingdom.

Awards 

 2015 - Won the Mohammed Amin Africa Award for her story on maternal health in Samburu County
 2018 - Nominated for Upstream Oil and Gas Journalist of the Year Award
 2017 - Won the Zimeo Excellence in Media Award
 2017 - Shortlisted for the Thompson Foundation Young Journalist of the Year Award
 2019 - Won the 2019 Michael Elliott Award for Excellence in African Storytelling for The App and The Cut, which was the harm caused by female genital mutilation and the hope offered by five tech-savvy teenage girls
 2019 - Won the Annual Journalism Excellence Award, Media Council of Kenya, ICT and Telecommunications Reporting Award: TV The award recognizes journalists who have written or produced outstanding articles/stories in the area of technological advancement to enable the public understand, embrace and use new inventions.
 2020 - Won the Merck More Than A Mother 2019 MultiMedia Award, East African Countries.
2021-Won the Isu Elihle Award for reporting on Children's Welfare
2021-Selected as a Falling Walls Science Fellow
2022-Won the Annual Journalism Excellence Award for Environmental Reporting (Digital Category)
2022-Runners Up Merck Foundation,Mask Up Award for Eastern Africa Countries

References

Living people
Kenyan journalists
Moi University alumni
The Economist people
Kenyan mass media people
Kenyan women journalists
Kenyan television journalists
Kenyan women television journalists
Year of birth missing (living people)